Thanks for the Feedback is a live album by The Presidents of the United States of America, the first and only full live album released by the band. It was released on February 14, 2014, alongside their sixth studio album, Kudos to You!.

Originally, the plan was for the tracks on this album to be "culled from various performances over the last 3 years or so", but the band ultimately decided to release an entire show (minus the encores, as they wouldn't fit on the CD) from their 2011 PUSAFEST.

The album was available as a digital download for anyone that pledged for their Kudos to You! album, with the added option to pledge for a physical copy of it as well. Back and front covers will be available for download through presidentsrock.com for those who chose not to get the actual CD. With the Pledge Music project having come to an end, this album is now only available as a digital download through the band's website.

Track listing

 "Lunatic to Love" – 3:46
 "Dune Buggy" – 2:36
 "Boll Weevil" – 3:31
 "Some Postman" – 3:15
 "Ladybug" – 2:39
 "Ghosts Are Everywhere" – 5:01
 "Jennifer's Jacket" – 2:31
 "Lump" – 2:10
 "Shreds of Boa" – 4:10
 "Bath of Fire" – 2:59
 "Froggie" – 6:09
 "Sharpen Up Those Fangs" – 2:50
 "Back Porch" – 4:19
 "More Bad Times" – 4:02
 "Deleter" – 3:50
 "Feather Pluckin'" – 3:04
 "Volcano" – 3:40
 "Kitty" – 3:27
 "Peaches" – 3:13
 "Kick Out the Jams" – 4:22

Personnel
 Chris Ballew – vocals, bass
 Andrew McKeag – guitars
 Jason Finn – drums
 Martin Feveyear – recording & mixing

References

2014 live albums
The Presidents of the United States of America (band) albums